Iwasaka Dam  is an earthfill dam located in Ishikawa Prefecture in Japan. The dam is used for flood control and irrigation. The catchment area of the dam is 4 km2. The dam impounds about 12  ha of land when full and can store 850 thousand cubic meters of water. The construction of the dam was started on 1972 and completed in 1984.

See also
List of dams in Japan

References

Dams in Ishikawa Prefecture